The men's freestyle 61 kg is a competition featured at the Golden Grand Prix Ivan Yarygin 2019, and was held in Krasnoyarsk, Russia on 24 January 2019.

Medalists

Results
Legend
F — Won by fall
WO — Won by walkover (forfeit)

Final

Top half

Repechage

References

Golden Grand Prix Ivan Yarygin 2019